Britney Jean is the eighth studio album by American singer Britney Spears. It was released on November 29, 2013, by RCA Records. The album is Spears's second eponymous record after Britney (2001), though the album's name refers to both her first and middle names. It marks Spears's first major activity since the dissolution of her longtime record label, Jive Records, in 2011. The singer began recording material for Britney Jean in May 2013, eventually continuing into October of that year. On numerous occasions, Spears has described the album as the most personal record from her catalog. Having assumed an integral position in its production, she co-wrote each track and collaborated with songwriters and producers including Sia and will.i.am to achieve her desired sound. Furthermore, the record features guest vocals from Spears's younger sister Jamie Lynn, T.I., and will.i.am. Musically, Britney Jean contains strong elements of EDM and pop.

Upon its release, Britney Jean received mixed reviews from music critics, who felt the album was impersonal despite its marketing, and were ambivalent towards its dated production. The album drew controversy over the authenticity of some vocals. The record debuted at number four on the US Billboard 200 with first-week sales of 107,000 copies. In doing so, it became Spears' lowest-peaking and lowest-selling record in the United States. The same happened in the United Kingdom, where it debuted at number 34; worldwide, Britney Jean reached the top 20 and top 30 in most countries. The album was eventually certified gold by the Recording Industry Association of America (RIAA) for combined album-equivalent units of 500,000.

"Work Bitch" was released as the lead single from Britney Jean on September 17, 2013. The track debuted and peaked at number 12 on the US Billboard Hot 100 and was a moderate success worldwide, later becoming one of her signature songs. "Perfume" was released as the second single from the album on November 3, 2013, and peaked at number 76 on the Billboard Hot 100. "Til It's Gone" impacted French radio on December 4, 2013, and "It Should Be Easy" impacted Italian radio on June 13, 2014, as the third and fourth single from the album, respectively. No further promotion was done for the record, a situation which was reported in the media. However, Spears appeared on Good Morning America on September 17, 2013, to announce a two-year (eventually extended to four years) residency show at Planet Hollywood Las Vegas, titled Britney: Piece of Me, which began on December 27, 2013, and concluded on December 31, 2017.

Recording and production 

In 2012, while serving as a judge on the second season of the American version of The X Factor, Spears was spotted in the recording studio with producer Rodney Jerkins. Songwriter Elijah Blake commented that Spears was "definitely trying to push the envelope" by "playing with new textures and stomping on new grounds and genres." Their collaborations, however, were denied by Spears's representative, though he confirmed that producer Hit-Boy worked with Spears to create a "global sound" fusing elements of hip-hop and pop. Producer Scoop DeVille had also worked with Spears for the album's early stages. Additionally, Spears had also recorded an unused song titled "Police" with rapper Wiz Khalifa for the album. In an interview with Shape, Spears described the album's initial concept as having a hip-hop feel, saying "the record is definitely going to be more hip-hop than pop this time around."

In May 2013, Naughty Boy and William Orbit were announced to be working on the record; the former expressed his satisfaction with his collaborations with Spears, adding that he had wanted always wanted to "do something a bit different." He commented that he is "a big fan of pop music and that culture", and wanted to "keep that going [...] in [his] own kind of style." Later that month, will.i.am was confirmed as the executive producer of the project. He described that his recording process differed from his past experience with the Black Eyed Peas, elaborating that "[he and Spears] had these juicy sessions, where [they had] been bonding, building the trust and comfort." The album's associate executive producer was Anthony Preston for will.i.am music. In July 2013, Spears acknowledged through Twitter that she "wrote such a special song" with Sia, which was later revealed to be Spears's favorite track, the ballad "Perfume". The following month, she reportedly traveled to Lake District in the United Kingdom to continue work with Naughty Boy and Orbit. Naughty Boy later stated he was not able to work on the material for the album with Orbit because he "wasn't able to come to L.A. at the time [as he] was promoting 'La La La' around the world." Charli XCX revealed in a 2022 interview that she wrote material for the album, but none of it made the cut.

On numerous occasions, Spears has considered Britney Jean to be the most personal record from her catalog. She stated that her experiences in recent years, including her break-up with ex-fiancé Jason Trawick, encouraged her to "dig deeper and write songs that [she thinks] everyone can relate to." Spears added that the production of the record was an "amazing experience" and that her colleagues "helped [her] bring [her ideas] to life." Spears told Rudolph, "I want Will to be a central figure in the album; I don't want to have hundreds of songs sent over."

Music and lyrics 
Britney Jean has been described as a concept album about "the loneliness of pop life." The opening track "Alien" deems celebrity an isolating experience that Spears describes in terms of feeling like an extraterrestrial over synth bleaps, which according to some critics, "it echoes William Orbit work with Madonna on Ray of Light." The second track "Work Bitch" is an EDM song, where Spears sings about what it takes to be rich, famous and beautiful, repeatedly encouraging listeners to "get to work, bitch." The third track "Perfume" is a 1980s-influenced power ballad, which Spears described as "incredibly special to me because it hits close to home, and I think the story is relatable to everyone. Everyone's been through an insecure moment in a relationship that's left them vulnerable and I think this song captures that." The fourth track "It Should Be Easy", which features will.i.am, insists that love "shouldn't be complicated," with Spears imagining a bright-normal-future with a man who's stolen her heart, with "robotized" voice and EDM beats. The song was heavily criticized for the excessive use of Auto-Tune, credited by will.i.am. The album's fifth track "Tik Tik Boom" finds Spears begging a lover to make her "tik, tik, tik, tik, boom" over trap beats. It was described as a "club banger" and "the closest the album comes to bringing Blackout 2.0 to life," featuring a "sex-drenched" appearance from rapper T.I.

"Body Ache" follows with its lyrical theme about dancing hard in a club, over shrieking sirens and EDM beats, whilst "Til It's Gone" gives value to the stability of a good relationship, albeit after it dissolves, with its electronic and EDM sounds. With the eighth track "Passenger,” which noodles around with some EDM impulses before imploding into "brooding" pop-rock, Spears emotes about finding happiness after being willing to cede control. "Chillin' with You" features Spears's younger sister Jamie Lynn into a song about grasping at happiness over lush trap, EDM and country pop sound. The album's closing track on the standard edition, "Don't Cry", opens with a spaghetti Western-esque whistle, and it finds Spears refusing to give in to post-relationship grief. Some critics labelled it "her best vocal performance on the album."

Title and artwork 
On October 15, 2013, during an appearance on Capital London, she announced that the record would be titled Britney Jean, a nickname used affectionately by her family and friends. On October 24, together with an open letter to her fans, Spears unveiled the album artwork. The black-and-white image depicts a close-up image of Spears with the term "Britney Jean" colored in blue lettering inside a pink heart near the bottom of the cover. A report from ABC News Radio likened the usage of Spears's middle name in the album's title to being inspired by Janet Jackson's eighth studio album Damita Jo, saying "taking a page from Janet Jackson's 2004 album, Damita Jo, Britney Spears has combined her first and middle names—Britney Jean—to come up with the title.” A writer for The Huffington Post later suggested that the neon-style typography was inspired by the cover of Miley Cyrus' fourth studio album Bangerz (2013), which itself depicts a blonde Cyrus wearing a short black coat with the title "Bangerz" stylized in fluorescent neon lighting in front of palm trees. While the typography was compared to that of Bangerz by a writer from The Huffington Post , Britney Jean marks the third album artwork from RCA Records to use a neon-style typography design, Bangerz from Miley Cyrus being one and the other being Mechanical Bull from Kings of Leon. Byron Flitsch of MTV News shared a similar sentiment, and added that the artwork was reminiscent of Spears’s fourth and seventh records In the Zone (2003) and Femme Fatale (2011). On November 4, a colorized version of the cover was unveiled as the primary visual for the standard edition, with the original cover becoming the primary visual for the deluxe edition.

Release and promotion 
In May 2013, record producer Danja, who collaborated with Spears during its production, commented that he "[doesn't] know when the next [Blackout] is going to be, but [he believes] there's going to be another one." On August 20, 2013, Spears relaunched her website with a countdown ending on September 17, originally speculated to be the release date of her then-unannounced lead single. On September 17, Spears announced on Good Morning America that her album would be released on December 3, 2013, in the United States, the day after her 32nd birthday. On November 4, the album was made available for pre-order through the iTunes Store. Spears revealed the track listing for Britney Jean on November 12, which she implied was earlier than she planned after hackers "[tried] to ruin [her] surprises." On November 20, the album leaked online, prompting the singer to address the leaks by saying: "To those of you listening to the leaks... I hope you love... I made this album specifically for my diehard fans so I'm just hoping every song touches you because each one is a piece of me.” Five days later, Britney Jean was made available for streaming in full through the iTunes Store and iTunes Radio. The record is additionally marked with the Parental Advisory label, affixed by the Recording Industry Association of America (RIAA) to identify explicit content.

Unlike her previous records, excluding her fifth studio album Blackout (2007), Spears did not heavily promote Britney Jean, and no promotional performances in support of the album took place. However, she appeared on Good Morning America to announce her two-year residency show at Planet Hollywood Resort & Casino, titled Britney: Piece of Me, on September 17. Spears then traveled to the United Kingdom to promote the lead single and the album on Alan Carr: Chatty Man. She also appeared for interviews on The Ellen DeGeneres Show, Entertainment Tonight, and Surprise Surprise. Britney Jean was additionally promoted through the documentary I Am Britney Jean, which premiered through E! on December 22; it covered the production and lead-up to its release and the launch of Britney: Piece of Me. The original airing of the special in the United States was viewed by 0.706 million viewers, garnering above-average Sunday ratings for the network, while it was viewed by 0.63 million viewers in the United Kingdom. Britney: Piece of Me began on December 27, with tickets having been first made available on September 20.

Singles 
"Work Bitch" was released as the lead single from Britney Jean on September 15, 2013, one day earlier than expected after a low-quality version was leaked by "one bad apple". A writer for MuuMuse described the track as a "massive return to form" and an "exciting way to kick off a brand new era". It debuted and peaked at number 12 on the US Billboard Hot 100 with 174,000 first-week downloads, and charted moderately on national singles charts internationally. An accompanying music video for the track was premiered on October 1, where Spears is depicted as a dominatrix-like character. It received general acclaim from critics, with particular praise directed towards her dancing. However, Spears herself commented that she felt forced into maintaining her provocative image, elaborating that she "cut out half the video because I am a mother and because, you know, I have children, and it's just hard to play sexy mom while you're being a pop star as well".

"Perfume" was released as the second single from Britney Jean on November 3, 2013. It received generally favorable reviews from music critics, and was compared to Spears's earlier song "Everytime", taken from her fourth studio album In the Zone (2003). The track debuted and peaked at number 76 on the Billboard Hot 100.

Official remixes for "It Should Be Easy" were commissioned and serviced to clubs in January 2014. A spokesperson for Spears said that it would not see a release as a fourth single and that the remixes were "commissioned purely to be used in nightclubs". However, on June 13, 2014, "It Should Be Easy" was made available to Italian radio stations, according to EarOne. "It Should Be Easy" charted at number 121 in France, number 88 in Canada and number 71 in Switzerland due to digital downloads.

Official remixes for "Tik Tik Boom" were also commissioned and serviced in February 2014. "Tik Tik Boom" charted at number 16 on South Korea's International Gaon Digital Chart.

In the documentary I Am Britney Jean, Spears mentions "Alien" becoming a single from the album at some point, but this never came to fruition. Despite not being released as a single, "Alien" charted at number eight on the US Bubbling Under Hot 100, and 147 on the French Singles Chart, organized by the Syndicat National de l'Édition Phonographique.

Critical reception 

Britney Jean received mixed-to-negative reviews from music critics. At Metacritic, which assigns a normalized rating out of 100 to reviews from mainstream critics, the album received an average score of 50, which indicates "mixed or average reviews", based on 21 reviews. Jason Lipshutz from Billboard provided a favorable review, describing the project as a "transitional record [as] her first album released in her thirties", and felt it was reminiscent of Spears's third studio album Britney (2001). Nick Catucci of Entertainment Weekly shared a similar sentiment, stating that he "treasures" Spears for "[remaining] as enigmatic as the Disney-groomed, emotionally insulated teen who greeted us in the late '90s", and adding that will.i.am's production "happily indulges the fantasies of endorphin-seeking EDM festival goers." Writing for Rolling Stone, Rob Sheffield described Britney Jean as a "concept album about the loneliness of pop life – with a high-profile broken engagement behind her, Brit gets personal and drops her most bummed-out music ever."

Some critics felt the album was impersonal despite its marketing. Chicago Tribune compared the album's contents to its title, noting: "the hype about her most 'personal' album yet begins with the album title [...] which promotes a sense of intimacy that the songs never quite deliver." The Atlantic described the album as "her most disappointing release yet", calling it "dull" and criticized the album's content matter, noting that "glimpses into Britney Jean Spears, the artist, are, frankly, neither interesting nor informative." Neil McCormick of The Daily Telegraph stated that Britney Jean "continues the striptease of Britney's career", and felt that its production prevented the record from coming across as a genuinely personal effort. Billboard noted that the album did "not fully shed light on its author's current mindset", and The New York Times described the album as being "about as personal as an airline preboarding announcement."

The production on the album was also pointed out by critics. Sal Cinquemani from Slant Magazine provided a mixed review, criticizing the album's "dated production and vocals that hark back to the days when Brit was selling 10 million [records]." Barry Walters from Spin criticized will.i.am's production on the album, claiming that the songs he produced "replace[d] melody with repetition and familiarity," but praised Spears's vocal delivery on "Don't Cry".

Accolades

|-
! scope="row"| 2013
| Billboard Mid-Year Music Award
| Most Anticipated Event
| Britney Jean
| 
| align="center"| 
|-
! scope="row" rowspan="3"| 2014
| rowspan="3"| PopCrush Fan Choice Award
| Song of the Year
| rowspan="2"| "Work Bitch"
| 
| rowspan="3" align="center"| 
|-
| Video of the Year
| 
|-
| Best Music Documentary
| I Am Britney Jean
| 
|-
! scope="row" rowspan="5"| 2014
| rowspan="5"| World Music Award
| World's Best Album
| Britney Jean
| 
| align="center"| 
|-
| rowspan="2"| World's Best Song
| "Work Bitch"
| 
| rowspan="2" align="center"| 
|-
| "Perfume"
| 
|-
| rowspan="2"| World's Best Video
| "Work Bitch"
| 
| rowspan="2" align="center"| 
|-
| "Perfume"
| 
|}

Commercial performance
Prior to its release in the United States, Britney Jean was initially predicted to sell 150–200,000 copies, with Hits Daily Double crediting the underwhelming numbers to "her very light promo schedule, with little or no TV around the release." However, the day following its release, potential sales figures were lowered to 115–120,000 units. The album debuted at number four with 107,000 units. It is Spears's lowest sales and chart debut for a studio set. Previously, her 1999 debut album, ...Baby One More Time, tallied her smallest start with 121,000. In its second week on the chart, the album fell from number four to number 22 on the Billboard 200, making it Spears's first album to only spend one week in the top ten. As of May 2020, Britney Jean has sold 280,000 copies in the United States.

In Europe, Britney Jean debuted at number 34 on the UK Albums Chart, selling 12,959 copies in its first week. In doing so, it became Spears's lowest-charting album in the country; by comparison, her previous lowest-charting record In the Zone (2003) peaked at number 13. It dropped to number 87 the next week. Internationally, Britney Jean reached the top 20 and 30 in most countries. However, the album debuted at number one in China.

Controversy
Prior to the release of the album, allegations were made by critics and fans that the vocals on the track "Passenger", which leaked online ahead of the release, were not entirely Spears's. Claims were made that Myah Marie, a backing vocalist present on Spears's albums Circus and Femme Fatale sang lead vocals on a large portion of this song as well as other songs on the album. Spears's team claimed that the song leak was a demo version. Chelsea Handler later accused Spears of not singing the lead vocals on "Perfume", insisting, "It's obviously a new person singing. It's not her." Reps for Spears responded, "Myah Marie didn't do any background vocals on the song and doesn't have credit. [The] only backing vocals on 'Perfume' are from Sia. Britney absolutely sings on 'Perfume'." Following the release of the album, Marie was not included in the credits for "Passenger" or "Perfume", though she was credited as a backing vocalist on a number of other songs from the album. The following year, with the online leak of vocal stems from "Alien", it was revealed that Marie's lead vocals were featured in this song as well.

Track listing 

Notes
 "Hold on Tight" was misprinted as "Hold on Tite" on the back cover of early CD pressings, but this was corrected on the Japanese edition.
 "Work Bitch" and its corresponding remixes on the Japanese and Chinese edition are titled "Work Work" on the clean editions of the album.
 signifies a vocal producer
 signifies a co-producer
 signifies an additional producer
 signifies a remixer

Personnel 
Credits adapted from AllMusic.

Daniel Andrés Aguilar – assistant, assistant vocal engineer
David Beckham – producer
Joe Bozzi – mastering
Christopher Braide – producer, vocal producer
Mark Cargill – concert master
AJ Clark – assistant, assistant vocal engineer
Daddy's Groove – mixing
Jacob Dennis – assistant vocal engineer
Ana Diaz – vocals
Michelangelo Di Battista – photography
Diplo – producer
Dylan Dresdow – vocal mixing
Karen Elaine – viola
Vanessa Freebairn-Smith – cello
Sia – background vocals
Freshm3n III – producer
Lucine Fyelon – violin
Şerban Ghenea – mixing
Onree Gill – string arrangements
Rachel Grace – violin
David Guetta – engineer, instrumentation, producer, programming
Neel Hammond – viola
Rani Hancock – A&R
John Hanes – mixing engineer
Keith Harris – producer
Joakim Harestad Haukaas – guitar
Zach Heiligman – additional production
Billy Hickey – assistant vocal engineer
Ghazi Hourani – assistant
Todd Hurtt – assistant vocal engineer
Hygrade – musician, producer, programming
Frances Iacuzzi – photography
Sebastian Ingrosso – engineer, musician, producer, programming
Chris Kahn – assistant vocal engineer
William Kebler "Keebz" – additional production
Padraic "Padlock" Kerin – engineer, project coordinator, vocal editing
Adam Leber – A&R
Damien Leroy – instrumentation, producer, programming
Andre Lindal – guitar, instrumentation, programming, vocal editing
Joshua Lopez – Acoustic guitar
Ginny Luke – violin
LWAM – additional production
Myah Marie – background vocals, lead vocal assistant
Alan O'Connell – engineer
William Orbit – musician, producer, programming
Otto Knows – engineer, musician, producer, programming
Joe Peluso – mixing, string engineer
Anthony Preston – associate executive producer, instrumentation, producer, programming, vocal producer, background vocals
Julian Prindle – project coordinator, vocal editing, vocal engineer
Pierre-Luc Rioux – guitar
Nicky Romero – instrumentation, mixing, producer, programming
Larry Rudolph – A&R
Bradford H. Smith – assistant, assistant vocal engineer
Britney Spears – lead vocals, composer
Jamie Lynn Spears – background vocals, guest vocals
Alan Tilston – engineer
JoAnn Tominaga – music contractor
Giorgio Tuinfort – engineer, instrumentation, piano, producer, programming
Michael Valerio – bass
Richard Vission – producer
Marcus Van Wattum – instrumentation, mixing, producer, programming, sound design
Ralph Wegner – sound design
will.i.am – engineer, executive producer, instrumentation, producer, programming, vocal producer, guest vocals
Adrienne Woods – cello

Charts

Weekly charts

Monthly charts

Year-end charts

Certifications and sales

Release history

Notes

References

External links 
 Official website

2013 albums
Britney Spears albums
RCA Records albums
Concept albums
Albums produced by will.i.am
Albums produced by William Orbit
Albums produced by Diplo
Albums produced by David Guetta
Albums produced by Dr. Luke
Albums produced by Nicky Romero
Albums produced by Cirkut
Albums produced by Chico Bennett
Music controversies